"Guardian Devil" is an eight-issue Daredevil story arc originally published by Marvel Comics in Daredevil (vol. 2) #1-8. It features the hero suddenly caring for an infant that may be either the Messiah or the Antichrist. The issues were written by filmmaker Kevin Smith and illustrated by Joe Quesada and Jimmy Palmiotti. The 1999 graphic novel combining the eight issues into one collection features an introduction by Ben Affleck, who portrayed Daredevil in the 2003 feature film adaptation (in which Kevin Smith had a supporting role). The story features strong Catholic themes, which came from writer Smith's own experiences.

Synopsis
Daredevil's love interest, Karen Page, breaks up with him because she is confused about her feelings for him. Angry and heartbroken, Daredevil falls back on his Catholic faith for support.

A 15-year-old girl who knows his secret identity leaves her baby with Daredevil, claiming that the baby was born without her ever having sex. As he tries to discover more about the child's origins, he is contacted by a man called Nicholas Macabes, who claims that the child is actually the Antichrist, leaving Daredevil a small crucifix. 

Karen visits Daredevil and reveals that she has HIV from her time as a porn star. His partner Foggy Nelson is accused of murdering a wealthy divorcee with whom he was having an affair, after she seemingly turned into a demon. Rosalynd Sharpe, who is both their boss and Foggy's mother, fires Foggy to avoid having his arrest affect the financial future of their law firm. Matt quits the firm in disgust. Daredevil asks for assistance from the Black Widow, but then attacks her, apparently convinced that Macabes was telling the truth about the child. Daredevil throws the baby off of the roof, prompting the Black Widow to leap off herself, saving the child. 

Daredevil speaks with Karen. She has been contacted by Macabes, who claims that the child is responsible for her HIV. Daredevil asks Doctor Strange for help. Strange tells Daredevil that the cross Macabes gave him was tainted with an undetectable drug which made him hostile whenever someone suggested that the child was innocent, revealing the cause of his attack on the Black Widow. Strange is able to purge the drug from Daredevil's system. 

Summoning Mephisto for information, Daredevil and Strange learn that the church where Murdock left the baby is under attack. Daredevil arrives back just in time to confront Bullseye, who has murdered several nuns. Daredevil is unable to stop Bullseye from killing Karen and stealing the baby.

After briefly contemplating suicide, Matt tracks Macabes to his headquarters, fighting his way to the final stronghold, where Macabes reveals that he is actually the villain Mysterio. It is revealed that he was disappointed when he deduced from newspaper articles that the current Spider-Man was just a clone and saw no dignity in overpowering a 'copy' (even though by then, the clone had been killed and the current Spider-Man was indeed the original). A year ago, Mysterio was diagnosed with an inoperable brain tumour. He resolved to die after enacting his greatest scheme, turning his attention to Daredevil.

Mysterio purchased information about Daredevil from the Kingpin, and began to set up his scheme. He used artificial insemination to impregnate the girl, drugged Foggy, faked the demonic transformation and death of the divorcee, posed as Karen's doctor to fake the HIV diagnosis, and hired Bullseye to lure Daredevil to him for a final confrontation. Mysterio believed that Daredevil would kill him when he learned of his plot. Daredevil dismissed Mysterio as unoriginal, pointing out that the Kingpin had already attempted to drive him insane once before, and that Mysterio had previously attacked J. Jonah Jameson with fake supernatural occurrences. Despondent, Mysterio frees the baby, and then—noting that his last move was stolen from Kraven—shoots himself. 

After Karen's funeral, a conversation with Spider-Man leads Daredevil to realize that the infant he had saved represented a positive outcome among the tragedy. His faith renewed, he names the baby after Karen and gives it up for adoption to a couple in New Jersey. He visits the Black Widow and asks for forgiveness. After Foggy is released from jail, he and Matt visit the site of their old office, and Matt suggests that he will use Karen's money—left to him in her will—to re-open their own practice.

Supplemental releases
 A prologue was released as a #0 cybercomic in September 2008.
 A special #1/2 issue was released through a promotion with Wizard #96.
 The story was released on DVD as a Digital Comic Book by Intec Interactive in 2003.

In other media
 Karen Page's death in this comic was alluded to in "The Rogues' Challenge" game on the DVD Spider-Man: The Return of the Green Goblin for Spider-Man: The Animated Series. One of the questions was which hero's girlfriend was Mysterio responsible for the death of. Two wrong answers were the Thing and Spider-Man, with Stan Lee hinting to eliminating the latter by saying that Mary Jane Watson was alive.
 Bullseye's fight with Daredevil in the church is loosely recreated in season 3 of Daredevil during episode 10 "Karen". In this version of the fight, Dex is dressed in a red Daredevil costume built by Melvin Potter and has been sent by Fisk to kill Karen as revenge for her killing James Wesley. While Ray Nadeem waits outside with a getaway car, Dex goes inside and incapacitates several parishioners with his batons to draw Karen out. As he prepares to kill Karen, Matt arrives from a failed attempt to infiltrate Fisk's penthouse to fight Dex, and is quickly incapacitated. While Matt is temporarily stunned, Dex kills Father Paul Lantom with one of his batons as the priest tries to shield Karen. A fight breaks out as Matt fights Dex, and Karen tries to get the trapped congregation out of the church. Eventually, to distract Dex, Karen lures him up to the church's balcony. Matt fights him again, but is easily overpowered. As Dex is preparing to finish Matt off with a wooden splinter, Karen uses a statue of Jesus Christ to knock him over the railing. While Dex flees, Karen breaks down sobbing as she cradles a battered and unconscious Matt, in a scene that reverses the panel of Matt holding Karen's dying form.

Collected editions

References

1998 comics debuts
1999 comics endings
Comics by Kevin Smith
Comics set in New York City